The Pickle Recipe is a 2016 American comedy film directed by Michael Manasseri and starring Jon Dore, Lynn Cohen and David Paymer.

Plot
Entertainer Joseph Miller is desperately in need of money. Recently all of his equipment for his job burned in a fire. His daughter Julie’s Bat Mitzvah is only a month away. He needs $20,000 in order to buy the replacement equipment. Now Joey’s grandmother Rose, an 85 year old Polish woman, holds what could be the world’s greatest pickle recipe. When Joey asks his Uncle Morty for help to get the money he needs, Morty suggests that together they steal the pickle recipe. The only problem, grandma Rose has not shared the recipe with a single other soul, nor is she looking to do so.

Cast
Jon Dore as Joey
Lynn Cohen as Rose
Miriam Lee as Hana
David Paymer as Uncle Morty
Eric Edelstein as Ted
Taylor Groothuis as Julie
Ashley Noel as Fran
Jean Zarzour as Psychic

Reception
The film has a 33% rating on Rotten Tomatoes.  Michael Heaton of The Plain Dealer graded the film a C+. Tom Long of The Detroit News graded the film a B.

Mark Sommer of The Buffalo News awarded the film two and a half stars out of four. Michael O'Sullivan of The Washington Post awarded it one and a half stars out of four. Bill Goodykoontz of The Arizona Republic gave the film two stars out of five.

The film also was featured at such festivals as Atlanta Jewish Film Festival and Enzian Theater.

References

External links

Interview with Lynn Cohen about 'The Pickle Recipe'

American comedy films
2010s English-language films
2010s American films